The Warren Street/NJIT station is one of four underground stations on the Newark City Subway Line of the Newark Light Rail. It is the furthest station from Downtown Newark that is underground.  The station is owned and service is operated by New Jersey Transit. The station has entrances on both sides of Lock Street, just north of Warren Street in University Heights. It is decorated with beige tiles and colored tiles for borders, mosaics and street indicator signs. This station is not wheelchair accessible.  The nearest accessible stations are Washington Street and Orange Street.

History
In 1910, the Public Service Railway planned to build two subway lines meeting at Broad Street (now Military Park). In 1929 construction began on the east-west subway line (#7), now the Newark Light Rail, which was built in the old Morris Canal bed with Raymond Boulevard built over it, and service started on the line on May 26, 1935, operated by the Public Service Corporation of New Jersey.  Additionally, the station contained a connection to the Main Street line until March 30, 1952 when the route was converted into bus route #21.

On March 7, 2011, the station's name was officially changed from Warren Street to Warren Street/NJIT with the help of New Jersey Institute of Technology and its students who initiated (and paid for) the name-change/makeover project.

Attractions
New Jersey Institute of Technology (NJIT)
Essex County College (ECC)

Transfers
Transfers are available to the following lines westbound to Orange and beyond only: 71, 73, and 79

References

External links

 Warren Street entrance from Google Maps Street View

Newark Light Rail stations
Railway stations in the United States opened in 1935
1935 establishments in New Jersey
Railway stations in New Jersey at university and college campuses